The Dark Side of Porn is a documentary series that examines the adult entertainment industry. It was produced by Lion Television for Channel 4 in the United Kingdom between 25 April 2005 and 19 April 2006. The series is produced and directed by a different person for each episode, and narrated by Christopher Eccleston.

Season 1 (2005)

Season 2 (2006)

References

External links 
 
 The Dark Side of Porn on YouTube

2005 British television series debuts
2006 British television series endings
2000s British documentary television series
Channel 4 documentary series
Television series by All3Media
English-language television shows